Feminist rhetoric emphasizes the narratives of all demographics, including women and other marginalized groups, into the consideration or practice of rhetoric. Feminist rhetoric does not focus exclusively on the rhetoric of women or feminists, but instead prioritizes the feminist principles of inclusivity, community, and equality over the classic, patriarchal model of persuasion that ultimately separates people from their own experience. Seen as the act of producing or the study of feminist discourses, feminist rhetoric emphasizes and supports the lived experiences and histories of all human beings in all manner of experiences. It also redefines traditional delivery sites to include non-traditional locations such as demonstrations, letter writing, and digital processes, and alternative practices such as rhetorical listening and productive silence. According to author and rhetorical feminist Cheryl Glenn in her book Rhetorical Feminism and This Thing Called Hope (2018), "rhetorical feminisim is a set of tactics that multiplies rhetorical opportunities in terms of who counts as a rhetor, who can inhabit an audience, and what those audiences can do." Rhetorical feminism is a strategy that counters traditional forms of rhetoric, favoring dialogue over monologue and seeking to redefine the way audiences view rhetorical appeals.

Definition and goals 
As a group that had been silenced for 2500 years, feminist rhetors began to gain strength with the Second Wave feminism of the 1960s–1970s, particularly through the writing of bell hooks who used common language and personal experiences as the basis for critically examining academic, cultural, and social issues. Rhetorical feminism as an academic discipline began to significantly evolve by the mid-1980s, when women in academia challenged the standards of western rhetorical tradition with feminist ideology.  Patricia Bizzell, Karlyn Kohrs Campbell, Lisa Ede, Cheryl Glenn, Shirley Wilson Logan, Andrea Lunsford, and Krista Ratcliffe were all early theorists of feminist rhetoric who made significant advances in the field.

In the mid-1990s, the traditional Aristotelian notion that rhetoric is fundamentally persuasive was questioned when feminist rhetors argued that persuasion reflects a patriarchal bias that simultaneously alienates people from their own experiences, cultures, and communicative practices and exerts power over them.  An emphasis of understanding rather than persuasion underpins much of rhetorical feminism, engaging with, collaborating and listening to the marginalized as equals. By redefining the “dehumanizing” definition of classical persuasive rhetoric, whereby one group’s experiences are dominated and devalued by another, more persuasive group, feminist rhetoric seeks to equalize and honor the experiences of all living beings.

Because rhetoric is a cultural artifact reflecting the social values of the society that creates it, the absence of women and other marginalized groups reveals the patriarchal silencing of women’s experiences; furthermore, the devaluation of women’s traditional depiction and experiences (emotional/passive) contrasts the elevation of men’s depiction and experiences (rational/active).  Scholars of feminist rhetoric add the stories of women into the history of rhetoric who have been previously overlooked or relegated to second-class status, combine issues in feminism and rhetorical theory, and produce rhetorical criticism from feminist perspectives with the ultimate goal of elevating historically marginalized voices. Feminist rhetorical scholars challenge and redefine the dominant patriarchal narrative, particularly Platonic and Aristotelian classifications and definitions.

History 
In 1973, feminist scholar Karlyn Kohrs Campbell wrote an influential essay, The Rhetoric of Women's Liberation: An Oxymoron, that drew feminists' attention to women's roles as communicators within rhetorical frameworks and to the relevance of feminist theory to the study of rhetoric. Feminist scholar Patricia Bizzell noted in 1992 that the classical canon of rhetoric consists almost entirely of well-educated male authors. In addition, scholars of feminist rhetoric argued that the field itself was suffused with patriarchal values. To address this perceived problem, they made efforts to include women authors in the history of rhetoric, established connections between feminist issues and theories of rhetoric, and wrote rhetorical criticism from feminist perspectives. While these academics were initially inspired by feminist scholarship outside of rhetoric and composition studies, they eventually developed a distinctive school within this tradition.

Following the initial feminist rhetoric movement, the Coalition of Women (later Feminist) Scholars in the History of Rhetoric and Composition was formed in 1988. According to its mission statement, this coalition "fosters inquiry in the histories, theories, and pedagogues of rhetoric and composition" for the "advancement of feminist research". It is composed of teachers and scholars dedicated to promoting the intersectionality of communication and collaboration within feminist rhetoric and research methods. Founding members included Winifred Horner, Jan Swearingen, Nan Johnson, Marjorie Curry Woods, and Kathleen Welch. Contemporary leading scholars include Andrea Lunsford, Jacqueline Jones Royster, Cheryl Glenn, and Shirley Wilson Logan. 1996 brought the publication of Peitho, the coalition's newspaper, published by Susan Jarratt. In present day feminist rhetoric, a point of emphasis is changing research methods and methodologies to include the discourse of "marginalized Others" such as African American, Chicanx, and Muslim women.

Feminist rhetoric works to expand the rhetorical canon introduced by the Roman orator Cicero in his treatise De Inventione (ca. 50 BCE) and the first century CE Roman rhetorician Quintilian in Institutio Oratoria. The classical rhetorical canon has been the foundation of rhetorical education since its creation. Feminist rhetoric scholars argue that this patriarchal canon and its methods of persuasion exclude valuable forms of public discourse and narrative, and they seek to redefine it accordingly.

Themes

Methodology in rhetoric studies 
Scholars such as Jessica Enoch and Jaqueline Jones Royster introduced the idea of changing the way research is recognized and constructed. Scholars in rhetoric studies agree there is a plethora of voices and demographics to draw upon for data necessary for research in the field. Researchers suggest this is achieved by asking questions that have never been asked before, recognizing the wealth of materials (or lack thereof) in archives, and expanding the idea of an archive. In recent years, archives have been deconstructed, or critically analyzed, outside of scholarly articles. Feminist rhetorical academics work to develop research methods and methodologies by including new types of archival research such as- yearbooks, small town newspapers, and community contributing archival websites. The research article, published by Cheryl Glenn, titled: "The language of rhetorical feminism, anchored in hope," provides an excellent insight into the study and usage of feminist rhetoric. Focusing mainly on "...the necessity of hope to the democratic ideal, where everyone has a voice –and uses it rhetorically. Second, I will explain the tactic I call "rhetorical feminism," which is anchored in hope; and, finally, I will meditate on hope and the possibilities of rhetorical feminism for us all."

Global narratives 
Feminist rhetoric is the study of persuasive communication that focuses on the social, political, cultural, and economic inequalities of genders. Specifically, transnational feminists such as Chandra Talpade Mohanty have addressed "how women's lives are shaped by national boundaries and histories of colonialism." Feminist rhetorical scholars ask questions of how rhetoric, writing studies, and social change intersect, or may be influenced by politics, the economy, religions, cultures, and education. A key term used in this field is "transnationality", defined as the culture of one nation moving through borders to another nation. It is used with the terms cultural hybridity and intertextuality, which continue the theory of cultures, texts, and ideas mixing with one another. In rhetorical feminist Cheryl Glenn's article, The Language of Rhetorical Feminism, Anchored in Hope, Glenn discusses how rhetoric has expanded to be more inclusive, and how democratic power lies in challenging systems that are not just, engaging citizens of global communities, and expanding accessibility. In doing so, we allow more people, including those who have been marginalized, to be involved in the democratic process which makes for a system that is more just.

Gender 
Feminist rhetoric seeks to redefine the patriarchal rhetorical voice that "separates thought from emotion " by joining thought and emotion in discourse. Furthermore, it works to represent the voices and discourse of genders that go beyond the binary of male and female. Transgender discourse is another main point of focus in feminist rhetoric, which is recognized by scholars as a lack of privilege some authors have. Royster and others have called for research focused on how gender dynamics affect communication, including rhetoric.

Race and ethnicity 
Race and ethnicity is an area of focus for several scholars in feminist rhetoric. They have changed research methods to include international races and ethnicity outside the typical rhetoric canon. Feminist rhetoric focuses on how archiving cultural rhetoric, such as that of Mexican-American women, can create a better understanding of the pedagogy of research methods. An issue that has arisen in feminist rhetoric is the discourse of women of color.  Black women scholars serve as a keeper of rhetorical culture by revealing the long-standing diversity of ideas, culture, and aesthetics of Black women's intellectual tradition, and the way Black women have constructed theory and practice in their daily lives.” Some female scholars of color have written about their perceived need to mask their identity when sharing their voices and opinions. Female rhetoric scholars of color have had experiences where they voiced their opinions publicly, and were either challenged or not entitled to comment just because they were part of a marginalized group. Feminist rhetoric theory works to legitimize the ethnic discourse of women and give it a platform in academic rhetoric and writing studies.

Challenges 
Feminist rhetoric scholars have noted the difficulty in including diverse voices in the rhetorical canon. Scholars have argued that changes in research methods may be needed to better include the voices of those who are disabled, trans, and queer or marginalized in some other way in rhetoric studies.

Despite longstanding feminist opposition to processes of canonization as inherently imposing limits and excluding perspectives, feminist rhetoric has begun to develop its own canon of commonly referenced texts. Accordingly, feminist rhetoric scholars try to include the works of unknown feminist rhetors in their theorization processes, and develop a gendered analysis or approach that actively includes rhetors who are traditionally excluded from rhetorical canons, such as women of color or low socioeconomic status.

Applications 
Rhetors, along with expanding the feminist rhetorical canon, work to make feminist rhetoric applicable in pedagogy and education. Scholars discuss the importance of research, whether that be changing research methods or looking further into textual research. Some suggest this can be done by theorizing, others want to employ critical imagination. Theory as a research method approaches discourse from different communities as a generalized idea that allows people to participate in the world through rhetoric. Feminist rhetoric sees theory in this sense as a form for people to speak out and be included in the rhetorical canon. Critical imagination is using the silence, or lack of work from feminist rhetors, to extrapolate. Scholars discuss how this involves understanding that there is more to not only feminist rhetoric, but feminist practice in theory, than what is written down in textbooks or history. Scholars, such as Royster and Kirsch, acknowledge that feminist rhetoric needs to draw from the silence to help set a new precedent for rhetorical practices in the future. A part of critical imagination is knowing that the documentation of rhetoric thus far isn’t the only important rhetoric that should contribute to pedagogy.

Implications 
A goal of feminist rhetoric is to be viewed as a rhetorical theory of writing as opposed to a social theory. Feminist rhetoric seeks to influence the pedagogy of writing in high school and other levels of academia. Scholars in the field of feminist rhetoric seek to open academic discourse and pedagogy of rhetoric to all types of people.

Further reading 
Royster & Kirsch (2012) recognize, among others, the following works as of particular interest:
 Cheryl Glenn, Rhetoric Retold: Regendering the Tradition from Antiquity through the Renaissance.
 Susan C. Jarratt, Rereading the Sophists: Classical Rhetoric Refigured
 Katherine H. Adams, Progressive Politics and the Training of American Persuaders
 Shirley Wilson Logan, Liberating Languages: Sites of Rhetorical Education in Nineteenth Century Black America
 Sandra Adickes, The Legacy of a Freedom School
 Karlyn Kohrs Campbell, Man Cannot Speak for Her
 Jessica Enoch, Refiguring Rhetorical Education: Women Teaching African American, Native American, and Chicano/a Students, 1865–1911
 Jacqueline Jones Royster, Traces of a Stream: Literacy and Social Change among African American Women
 Kristine Blair and Pamela Takayoshi, Feminist Cyberspaces: Mapping Gendered Academic Cyberspaces
 Kathleen Welch, The Contemporary Reception of Classical Rhetoric: Appropriations of Ancient Discourse and Electric Rhetoric: Classical Rhetoric, Oralism, and a New Literacy

References

Rhetoric
Feminism
Applied linguistics
Narratology
Critical thinking skills
Communication studies